The Sydney Cricket Ground (SCG) is a sports stadium in Sydney, Australia. The ground is considered "one of the world's most famous cricket venues" and was established in 1848. As well as cricket, it is used for Australian Rules Football by the Sydney Swans and has been used as a venue for Rugby League, Rugby Union, Lawn Tennis and a range of other sports. It was the main stadium used for the 1938 British Empire Games. The ground hosted its first Test match in 1882 when Australia played the England cricket team. The first One Day International (ODI) on the ground was played in 1979 and the first Twenty20 International (T20I) in 2007. The first women's Test match on the ground was played in 1934. Women's ODIs have been played on the ground since 2000 and T20Is since 2009.

In cricket, a five-wicket haul (also known as a "five-for" or "fifer") refers to a bowler taking five or more wickets in a single innings. This is regarded as a notable achievement. This article details the five-wicket hauls taken on the ground in official international Test and One Day International matches.

The first five-wicket haul on the ground in international cricket was taken by Australian bowler Joey Palmer in the ground's first Test match. Palmer took seven wickets for a cost of 68 runs (7/68) from 58 four-ball overs. The best innings bowling on the ground in a Test match is the 8/35 taken by Englishman George Lohmann in 1888, whilst his opponent Charles Turner's 12 wickets for 87 runs in the same match remain the best match bowling analysis in Test cricket on the ground. The only five-wicket haul taken in a women's Test match on the ground was taken by Australia's Joy Partridge in the ground's first women's Test in 1934.

The first five-wicket haul in a One Day International was taken by Australia's Len Pascoe in December 1980 who took 5/30 against New Zealand. The best bowling figures in an ODI on the ground were taken the following month by Pascoe's team-mate Greg Chappell who took 5/15 against India. The only five-wicket haul in a women's ODI on the ground was taken by Australia's Charmaine Mason in 2000.

Key

Test match five-wicket hauls

A total of 154 five-wicket hauls have been taken in Test matches on the ground, including one in a women's Test match and one in a match involving an ICC World XI.

One Day International five-wicket hauls

17 five-wicket hauls have been taken in One Day Internationals on the ground, including one in a women's ODI.

Notes

References

External links
International five-wicket hauls on the Sydney Cricket Ground, CricInfo

Sydney Cricket Ground